Prodanović is a Serbian surname, derived from the name Prodan. It may refer to:

Boško Prodanović (born 1943), Former Bosnian footballer
Jaša Prodanović, Former Serbian Minister for Serbia in Yugoslav government
Ilija Prodanović (born 1979), Bosnian Serb footballer
Milan Prodanović, Serbian basketball player
Mileta Prodanović, Serbian author
Miloš Prodanović, Serbian handball player
Nenad Prodanović, Former Serbian bobsledder
Radivoj Prodanović, Serbian politician
Rajko Prodanović (born 1986), Serbian handballer
Vasilije Prodanović (born 1985), Serbian footballer

Serbian surnames
Patronymic surnames
Surnames from given names